Arkansas Woodchopper, or Arkie (b. Luther Ossenbrink, March 2, 1906 - June 23, 1981) was an American country musician.

He was born in the Ozarks near Knob Noster, Missouri, to a family who owned a farm and a general store. He taught himself to play guitar and fiddle so he could play at local square dances, and his first job in music was performing on radio in Kansas City on KMBC in 1928. He started at WLS in 1930, performing on their National Barn Dance, and became one of the show's most popular performers, continuing there until 1959. During this time he also released records for Columbia Records and Conqueror Records. Book of sheet music 'THE ARKANSAS WOODCHOPPER'S WORLD'S GREATEST COLLECTION OF COWBOY SONGS WITH YODEL ARRANGEMENT' copyright 1931 published by M.M. Cole Publishing House, Chicago contains 35 songs, 64 pages. He once performed with Al Trace's orchestra with the song "Why Go Home?" and although his recordings for Columbia, Gennett Records, American Record Corporation, Okeh Records sold well, he never established himself as a major musician.

Discography

References

External links
Arkansas Woodchopper at Hillbilly-Music.com

American country singer-songwriters
Singer-songwriters from Missouri
1906 births
1981 deaths
20th-century American singers
People from Johnson County, Missouri
Country musicians from Missouri